was a Japanese physicist. He served as a professor of the physics department at the College of Science, Tohoku Imperial University.

Aichi was born in Tokyo in 1880 and studied theoretical physics at University of Tokyo. He graduated in 1903 and in 1905 moved to Kyoto where he became an assistant professor at Kyoto University. Between 1908 and 1911 he studied in Germany and in 1912 defended his PhD at Tohoku Imperial University with recommendations from the chancellor. Soon after, he assumed the post of professor at the university's then newly established College of Science. In 1922, he served as an interpreter during the visit of Albert Einstein in Japan. Aichi died from food poisoning in 1923.

His son was the politician Kiichi Aichi, who served consecutively as Minister for Foreign Affairs and Minister of Finance.

Books
 Jitsuyō kōtō sūgaku 『実用高等数学』 (co-authored with ) Dainippon Tosho, 1909
 Shizen no bi to megumi: Kagaku sōwa 『自然の美と恵—科学叢話』 (Beauty and grace of nature: Science stories) Maruzen, 1917
 Rikigaku 『力学』 (Mechanics) Shōkabō, 1919
 Hōshanō gairon 『放射能概論』 (Introduction to Radiation) Maruzen, 1920
 Denkigaku no taito Faradē no den 『電気学の泰斗ファラデーの伝』 (Story of Faraday – the father of electricity) Iwanami Shoten, 1922
 Denshi no jijoden: Tsūzoku denki kōwa 『電子の自叙伝—通俗電気講話』 Shōkabō, 1922
 Rironbutsurigaku 『理論物理学』 (Theoretical Physics) Shōkabō, 1924

Translations

References

External links
 Tohoku University Image Database – Profile photograph (Japanese)
 Contemporary Digital Library at the National Diet Library – Digitized images of Jitsuyō kōtō sūgaku, Rikigaku, Hōshanō gairon and Rironbutsurigaku can be viewed here. (Japanese)
 Faradē no den – Online version of Denkigaku no taito Faradē no den'' at Aozora Bunko (Japanese)

20th-century Japanese physicists
1880 births
1923 deaths
University of Tokyo alumni
Academic staff of the University of Tokyo
Academic staff of Kyoto University
Academic staff of Tohoku University
Deaths from food poisoning